Zaio (Tarifit: Zayyu, ⵣⴰⵢⵢⵓ; Arabic:  زايو) is a municipality located in the province of Nador in northeastern Morocco. On January 1, 2005, Zaio had a total population of 32,000.

Further reading
 Seddon, David. 1987. Zaio Transformed: Two Decades of Change in North-East Morocco. Middle Eastern Village.
 Seddon, David. Class Formation in Zaio: Two Decades of Change in Northeast Morocco. Norwich [England]: School of Development Studies, University of East Anglia, 1986.

Populated places in Nador Province